Aspilonaxa is a genus of moths in the family Geometridae.

Oenochrominae
Geometridae genera